GenScript Biotech Corporation (Stock Code: 1548.HK) is a global biotechnology group, founded in New Jersey, United States in 2002, by Dr. Fangliang (Frank) Zhang, Mrs. Ye (Sally) Wang, and Dr. Luquan Wang, and listed on the Hong Kong Stock Exchange in 2015. The rotating CEO of GenScript is currently Shao Weihui. GenScript’s legal entities located in the US, mainland China, Hong Kong China, Japan, Singapore, the Netherlands, Ireland and other countries and regions. GenScript operates in more than 100 countries and regions around the world. For a long time, GenScript has provided high-quality, convenient and reliable services and products to more than 200,000 customers. As of June 30, 2022, GenScript had more than 5500 employees globally.

GenScript consists of four major groups:

 Life science group contract research organization (CRO) and products platforms, which provides customized services and catalog products
 Biologics contract development and manufacturing organization (CDMO) group
 Global cell therapy group
 Industrial synthesis product platform ,

History 
GenScript was founded in 2002 in New Jersey, and in 2004 established a research and production center in Nanjing, China. In 2011, the company opened a new Nanjing research and production facility and established a subsidiary in Japan. In 2013, the company launched a subsidiary called Bestzyme, focused on industrial synthetic biology products, followed by Legend Biotech in 2014, focused on cell therapy.

In 2015, GenScript Biotech Corporation was listed on the Hong Kong Stock Exchange under stock code 1548. In 2017, the China Food and Drug Administration (CFDA) accepted an investigational new drug (IND) application by Legend Biotech, leading to the establishment of a collaboration on a B-cell maturation antigen (BCMA) program between Legend and Janssen Pharmaceuticals. In 2018, Legend's BCMA program received IND clearance in the United States and China. GenScript's Biologics CDMO segment was established shortly thereafter.

In 2019, GenScript launched its new Biologics GMP CDMO R&D center and established its European and Asia-Pacific division. Legend's BCMA program received Orphan drug designation (FDA) & PRIME designation (EMA), US phase 1b data at ASH 2019: ORR 100%.

In 2020, GenScript and Duke-NUS Medical School co-developed a cPass sVNT kit, first in the world SARS-CoV-2 serology test to detect neutralizing antibodies. Legend Biotech was listed on NASDAQ under stock code LEGN.

GenScript participated as a sponsor of the 2021 International Genetically Engineered Machine Synthetic Biology Competition (iGEM).

Operations 
GenScript owns a number of intellectual property rights and trade secrets, Including over 190 patents, over 820 pending patent applications.

GenScript Life Science Group 
GenScript Life Science Group is GenScript's original business unit. Based on its independent and leading gene synthesis technology, the GenScript Life Science business has grown to become the world's largest gene synthesis provider with a market share of approximately 30%. As of June 30, 2022, over 74,700 peer-reviewed journal articles worldwide have cited GenScript Biotech's services and products.

GenScript ProBio – Bio-pharmaceutical CDMO 
GenScript ProBio is the bio-pharmaceutical CDMO segment, which has established companies in the United States, the Netherlands, South Korea, and China (Hong Kong, Shanghai, and Nanjing) and other regions., As of September, 2022, GenScript ProBio assisted the clients in receiving 37 IND approvals.

Legend Biotech – Cell Therapy 
A a subsidiary of GenScript Biotech Corporation, Legend Biotech (NASDAQ: LEGN) is a global clinical-stage biopharmaceutical company engaged in the discovery and development of novel cell therapies for oncological and other indications. With a team of more than 650 employees located in the US, China and Europe, Legend Biotech has a differentiated technology development and manufacturing strategy and expertise, Legend Biotech is dedicated to developing and manufacturing cell therapies for patients in need.

Legend Biotech has established a strategic collaboration with Janssen Biotech to develop and commercialize the lead product candidate, LCAR-B38M/JNJ-4528, an investigational BCMA-targeted CAR-T cell therapy for patients living with relapsed or refractory multiple myeloma. This candidate is currently being studied in registrational clinical trials.

Bestzyme – Industrial Synthesis Product 
Nanjing Bestzyme Bioengineering Co., Ltd. (Bestzyme) is one of GenScript's subsidiaries，conducts industrial synthetic biology product business，integrates the development of enzyme preparations and the R&D, production, and sales of enzyme catalysis technology for active product ingredients (API).

References

Companies listed on the Hong Kong Stock Exchange
Biotechnology companies of the United States
Companies established in 2002
Companies based in Middlesex County, New Jersey
Piscataway, New Jersey